The 2013–14 Bangladesh Premier League is also known as Nitol-Tata Bangladesh Premier League due to the sponsorship from Nitol-Tata. It was the 7th edition of the Bangladesh Premier League since its establishment in 2007. A total of 10 football clubs competed in the league. The country's top-flight football competition was started on 27 December 2013.

Sheikh Russell  are the defending champions after claiming their first Bangladesh Premier League championship.

Teams and locations

Arambagh representing the city of Dhaka were relegated last season and replaced by Chittagong Abahani the 2013 Bangladesh Championship League champions and Baridhara.

Foreign players

Standings

League table

Season statistics

Goalscorers

Own goals 
† Bold Club indicates winner of the match

Hat-tricks 

n  Player scored n goals.

References

Bangladesh Football Premier League seasons
Bangladesh
1
1